John Whalley (27 November 1872 – 29 October 1925) was an Australian cricketer. He played in one first-class match for Queensland in 1904/05.

See also
 List of Queensland first-class cricketers

References

External links
 

1872 births
1925 deaths
Australian cricketers
Queensland cricketers
Cricketers from Brisbane